The molecular formula  (molar mass: 175.18 g/mol, exact mass: 175.0633 u) may refer to:

 Gentianine, a pyridine-derived alkaloid found in some plants
 Indole-3-acetic acid, the most common naturally occurring plant hormone of the auxin class